The siege of Seringapatam (5 April – 4 May 1799) was the final confrontation of the Fourth Anglo-Mysore War between the British East India Company and the Kingdom of Mysore. The British, with the allied Nizam Ali Khan, 2nd Nizam of Hyderabad and Marathas, achieved a decisive victory after breaching the walls of the fortress at Seringapatam and storming the citadel. The leader of the British troops was Major General David Baird, among the lesser known allies were the Portuguese in Goa and Damaon.  Tipu Sultan, the de facto ruler after the death of his father, who had usurped the throne of Mysore, was killed in the action. The British restored the Wodeyar dynasty back to power after the victory through a treaty of subsidiary alliance, Krishnaraja Wodeyar III was crowned the King of Mysore.  However, they retained indirect control (British paramountcy) of the kingdom's external affairs.

Opposing forces
The battle consisted of a series of encounters around Seringapatam (the anglicised version of Srirangapatnam) in the months of April and May 1799, between the combined forces of the British East India Company and their allies, numbering over 50,000 soldiers in all, and the soldiers of the Kingdom of Mysore, ruled by Tipu Sultan, numbering up to 30,000. The Fourth Anglo-Mysore War came to an end with the defeat and death of Tipu Sultan in the battle.

British troop composition
When the Fourth Anglo-Mysore War broke out, the British assembled two large columns under General George Harris. The first consisted of over 26,000 British East India Company troops, 4,000 of whom were European while the rest were local Indian sepoys. The second column was supplied by the Nizam of Hyderabad, and consisted of ten battalions and over 16,000 cavalry. Together, the allied force numbered over 50,000 soldiers. Tipu's forces had been depleted by the Third Anglo-Mysore War and the consequent loss of half his kingdom, but he still probably had up to 30,000 soldiers.

The British forces consisted of the following:

19th Regiment of (Light) Dragoons
25th Regiment of (Light) Dragoons
12th (East Suffolk) Regiment of Foot
33rd (1st Yorkshire West Riding) Regiment of Foot
73rd (Highland) Regiment of Foot
74th (Highland) Regiment of Foot
75th (Highland) Regiment of Foot
77th Regiment of Foot
Scotch Brigade [later 94th Regiment]
Regiment de Meuron (Swiss mercenaries in British pay)

The Indian (sepoy) forces consisted of the following:
1st Madras Native Infantry
2nd Madras Native Infantry
1st Madras Native Cavalry
2nd Madras Native Cavalry
3rd Madras Native Cavalry
4th Madras Native Cavalry
Madras Pioneers
Madras Artillery
1st Bengal Native Infantry
2nd Bengal Native Infantry
Bengal Artillery
71st Coorg Rifles

Siege

Seringapatam was besieged by the British forces on 5 April 1799. The River Cauvery, which flowed around the city of Seringapatam, was at its lowest level of the year and could be forded by infantry – if an assault commenced before the monsoon. When letters were exchanged with Tipu, it seemed that he was playing for time. He requested two persons to be sent to him for discussions and also stated that he was preoccupied with hunting expeditions. Tipu Sultan's Chief Minister, Mir Sadiq, is alleged to have been bought over by the British. The British had sought the assistance of Mir Sadiq who, like Purnaiya and Qamar-ud-din Khan, had been for sometime past carrying on correspondence with the English against his master( p. 313).

The breach

The Governor-General of India, Richard Wellesley, planned the opening of a breach in the walls of Seringapatam.  The location of the breach, as noted by Beatson, the author of an account of the Fourth Mysore War, was 'in the west curtain, a little to the right of the flank of the north-west bastion. This being the old rampart appeared weaker than the new.'  The Mysorean defence succeeded in preventing the establishment of a battery on the north side of the River Cauvery on 22 April 1799.  However, by 1 May, working at night, the British had completed their southern batteries and brought them up to the wall.  At sunrise on 2 May, the batteries of the 2nd Nizam of Hyderabad succeeded in opening a practical breach in the outer wall.  In addition, the mines that were laid under the breach were hit by artillery and blew up prematurely.

The leader of the British troops was Major General David Baird, an implacable enemy of Tipu Sultan: twenty years earlier, he had been held captive for 44 months. The storming troops, including men of the 73rd and 74th regiments, clambered up the breach and fought their way along the ramparts.

On the night of 3 May some officers crossed over to the glacis, examined the breach and the manner of attacking the fort (Lushington, Life of Harris, p. 325). It was probably on this occasion that it was arranged between the English officers and Mir Sadiq that the assault should take place at midday( p. 313).

Storming of Seringapatam

The assault was to begin at 1:00 p.m. to coincide with the hottest part of the day when the defenders would be taking refreshment.  Led by two forlorn hopes, two columns would advance upon the defences around the breach, then wheel right and left to take over the fortifications.  A third reserve column, commanded by Arthur Wellesley, would deploy as required to provide support where needed.

At 11:00 a.m., on 4 May 1799, the British troops were briefed and whiskey and a biscuit issued to the European soldiers, before the signal to attack was given. The forlorn-hopes, numbering seventy-six men, led the charge.  The columns quickly formed, were ordered to fix bayonets, and began to move forward.

As the hour approached, Mir Sadiq withdrew the troops stationed at the breach under the pretext of distributing their pay. There was no one to protest against such a measure. Sayyid Abdul Ghaffar, who was very loyal to the Sultan, was killed by a cannon ball. Immediately after the Sayyid was killed, the traitors made a signal from the fort holding out a white handkerchief to the English troops who were assembled in the trenches, waiting for such a signal p. 313-314).

The storming party dashed across the River Cauvery in water four feet deep, with covering fire from British batteries, and within 16 minutes had scaled the ramparts and swept aside the defenders quickly. The British follow-up columns turned right and left, sweeping along the inside of the walls until they met on the far side of the city.

Death of Tipu

The column that rounded the northwest corner of the outer wall was immediately involved in a serious fight with a group of Mysorean warriors under a fat officer, which defended every traverse. The officer was observed to be discharging hunting weapons loaded and passed to him by servants. After the fall of the city, in the gathering dusk, some of the British officers went to look for the body of Tipu Sultan. He was identified as the fat officer who had fired hunting weapons at the attackers, and his body was found in a choked tunnel-like passage near the Water Gate.

Benjamin Sydenham described the body as:

Legacy
All members of the British-led forces who took part in the siege were awarded a medal by the Governor-General of India.

Two cannon captured by the British during the battle are displayed at the Royal Military College, Sandhurst, now standing in front of the officers' mess. Tipu's Tiger, an automaton now in the Victoria & Albert Museum, was captured at Seringapatam.

Much of the site of the battle is still intact including the ramparts, the Water Gate where the Tipu Sultan's body was found, the area where the British prisoners were held, and the site of the destroyed palace.

Around 80 men of the Swiss ‘de Meuron Regiment’, who fell during the siege, and their family members are buried in the Garrison Cemetery, Seringapatam.

Depictions in literature
Wilkie Collins's novel The Moonstone begins with the looting of the jewels removed from Seringapatam in 1799 from Tipu's treasury. The siege was also depicted in H.M Milner's play ""Tippo Saib, Or The Storming of Seringatam" in 1823 at the Royal Colburg Theatre on the South Bank, London. The siege and Tipu's death also received considerable attention in France, as Tipu had been viewed as an ally of the French, with the most prominent being Étienne de Jouy's "Tippo-Saëb,tragédie" which premiered at the Comédie-Française in 1813 with Talma in the lead role.

The Battle of Seringapatam is the main conflict in the novel Sharpe's Tiger, by Bernard Cornwell.

Memorial by the Mysore government

See also 
 Anglo-Mysore Wars
 Garrison Cemetery, Seringapatam
 Regiment de Meuron
 Seringapatam medal

References 

 Jac Weller, 2006, Wellington in India, Greenhill Books, London, . (Review.)
 Elizabeth Longford, 1996, Wellington: The Years of the Sword, Smithmark Pub, New York, .

External links

 A detailed analysis of the war with Tipu

1799 in India
Seringapatam 1799
Srirangapatna
Seringapatam 1799
Seringapatam
Seringapatam